Anthoscopus is a genus of birds in the penduline tit family Remizidae. The genus is restricted to Sub-Saharan Africa, where it ranges from the Sahel to South Africa. Unlike many of the Eurasian penduline, these species are not generally migratory, instead remaining close to their breeding sites year round.  A wide range of habitats is occupied by the six species, from deserts to woodlands to rainforest.

Nests 
Their pendulous and elaborately woven nests have false entrances above the true entrance, these in turn lead to a false chamber. The true nesting chamber is accessed by the parent opening a hidden flap, entering and then closing the flap shut again, the two sides sealing with sticky spider webs. These false entrances are used to confuse potential predators and protect the eggs and nestlings.

Taxonomy 

The genus Anthoscopus was introduced in 1851 by the German ornithologist Jean Cabanis with the Cape penduline tit as the type species. The genus name combines the Ancient Greek anthos meaning "blossom" or "flower" with skopos meaning "searcher". 

The genus contains the following six species:

References

 
Bird genera
Taxonomy articles created by Polbot